This page lists public opinion polls conducted for the 2019 European Parliament election in France, was held on 26 May 2019.

Unless otherwise noted, all polls listed below are compliant with the regulations of the national polling commission (Commission nationale des sondages) and utilize the quota method.

Graphical summary 
The averages in the graphs below were constructed using polls listed below, excluding those conducted on behalf of a political party or movement. Trendlines are local regressions. Where possible, the scenario with gilets jaunes lists is used.

Voting intentions 
Polls marked with an asterisk (*) were conducted on behalf of a political party. The May 2018 Viavoice poll was conducted for Europe Ecology – The Greens (EELV). The October 2018 Ifop polls tested two scenarios: one in which Ségolène Royal did not lead the Socialist Party (PS) list (in which the PS received 6%), and the other in which she did (in which it the PS received 7.5%). The December 2018 Ipsos poll was commissioned by La République En Marche! and obtained by Le Journal du Dimanche, and the Ifop poll fielded from 3 to 4 December was conducted for Raphaël Glucksmann's movement Place Publique (including the movement in a union list of the left).

Ifop-Fiducial polls completed on or after 7 March listed in the table below are "rolling" polls unless otherwise denoted by two asterisks (**), as is the case with Harris Interactive polls completed on or after 26 April. Starting on 15 March, the Ifop-Fiducial poll asked specifically about a list consisting of Place Publique and the Socialist Party, as opposed to the PS alone; until 26 March, it continued to ask about a list conducted by the NPA, which later ruled out its participation in the European elections due to its lack of funds; and until 15 April, also continued to ask about a Résistons! list, which also lacked sufficient financing.

In 2014, the EELV alone received 8.95% of valid votes; in 2019, the party will run in a common list with the Independent Ecological Alliance (AEI) and Régions et Peuples Solidaires (R&PS), which received 1.12% and 0.34% of the vote in 2014, respectively, for a total of 10.41% of votes in 2014. The PS, which will run in a common list alongside Place Publique, received 13.98% of valid votes in 2014; in 2019, it will also be allied with New Deal, which received 2.90% of the vote in 2014; together, the lists received 16.88% of the vote in 2014.

On 4 May 2019, following the publication of the entire list of 33 electoral lists in the election by the Ministry of the Interior, the polling commission recommended that pollsters test all 33 lists with the names, supporting parties, and lead candidates, and list the individual scores for each list even for those lists which obtain only low voting intentions, using a designation such as "less than 0.5%" if necessary.

The publication of polls will be prohibited after midnight on 24 May 2019.

As in every national vote, several polling firms will release estimations of the results after the closing of ballot boxes, including Harris Interactive with Epoka (on behalf of TF1, RTL, Le Figaro), as well as Ipsos with Sopra Steria (on behalf of France Télévisions with Radio France), a partnership running through 2022.

See also 
Opinion polling for the 2014 European Parliament election in France
Opinion polling for the 2009 European Parliament election in France

Notes 
Additional lists

References

External links 
Notices of the French polling commission 
Continuous results for the Ifop-Fiducial rolling poll (Ifop site) 
Continuous results for the Ifop-Fiducial rolling poll (Paris Match site) 
Continuous results for the Harris Interactive rolling poll 

2019 European Parliament election
Opinion polling in France
France